Traffic is the eighth studio album by English band ABC and their first album of original material released in eleven years. The album's songs were written while the band toured the United States in 2006. One critic has described the album as the most "satisfying ABC album since the mid-'80s by far".

Drummer David Palmer, who left the band in 1982 after recording The Lexicon of Love, returned to record this album, for which he co-wrote all of the tracks. Gary Langan also returned to mix the album after working as a sound engineer on The Lexicon of Love and producing Beauty Stab.

AllMusic described Traffic as "the album that ABC fans were probably hoping for in 1985" and considered that Fry's "lyrical mastery was back in place" in the album's songs which showed "an elegant mix of soul and style".

Track listing 
All songs written and composed by Martin Fry, Chuck Kentis and David Palmer.

"Sixteen Seconds to Choose" – 3:12
"The Very First Time" – 3:39
"Ride" – 3:37
"Love Is Strong" – 4:07
"Caroline" – 4:45
"Life Shapes You" – 3:50
"One Way Traffic" – 3:44
"Way Back When" – 4:13
"Validation" – 3:57
"Lose Yourself" – 4:03
"Fugitives" – 4:02
"Minus Love" – 4:08

Singles 
The album's first single, "The Very First Time", received airplay on BBC Radio 2. A poll on the band's MySpace page considered that "Life Shapes You" would make the best second single but in fact "Love Is Strong" was selected. "Love Is Strong" was released as a single on 18 August 2008.

Personnel 
ABC
 Martin Fry – vocals
 David Palmer – drums, percussion

Additional musicians
 Steve Kelly – keyboards
 Chuck Kentis – keyboards
 Jason Nesmith – keyboards, guitars, bass, backing vocals 
 Matt Backer – guitars
 Don Kirkpatrick – guitars
 Oliver Leiber – guitars
 Paul Warren – guitars
 Andy Carr – bass 
 Lance Morrison – bass 
 Simon Willescroft – saxophones
 David Williamson – trombone
 Dan Carpenter – trumpet
 Julie Delgado – backing vocals
 Natasha Pierce – backing vocals
 Jackie Simley – backing vocals
 Fred White – backing vocals

Production 
 Martin Fry – producer 
 Chuck Kentis – producer 
 David Palmer – producer 
 Gary Langan – mix engineer 
 Ian Cooper – mastering 
 Storey London Design – artwork 
 Blueprint Management – management

References

External links 
 Traffic at Amazon.co.uk

2008 albums
ABC (band) albums